The actuarial credentialing and exam process usually requires passing a rigorous series of professional examinations, most often taking several years in total, before one can become recognized as a credentialed actuary. In some countries, such as Denmark, most study takes place in a university setting. In others, such as the U.S., most study takes place during employment through a series of examinations. In the UK, and countries based on its process, there is a hybrid university-exam structure.

Policies of various countries

Australia
The education system in Australia is divided into three components: an exam-based curriculum; a professionalism course; and work experience. The system is governed by the Institute of Actuaries of Australia.

The exam-based curriculum is in three parts. Part I relies on exemptions from an accredited under-graduate degree from either Bond University, Monash University, Macquarie University, University of New South Wales, University of Melbourne, Australian National University or Curtin University. The courses cover subjects including finance, financial mathematics, economics, contingencies, demography, models, probability and statistics. Students may also gain exemptions by passing the exams of the Institute of Actuaries in London. Part II is the Actuarial control cycle and is also offered by each of the universities above. Part III consists of four half-year courses of which two are compulsory and the other two allow specialization.

To become an Associate, one needs to complete Part I and Part II of the accreditation process, perform 3 years of recognized work experience, and complete a professionalism course. To become a Fellow, candidates must complete Part I, II, III, and take a professionalism course. Work experience is not required, however, as the Institute deems that those who have successfully completed Part III have shown enough level of professionalism.

Canada
The Canadian Institute of Actuaries (the CIA) recognizes fellows of both the Society of Actuaries and the Casualty Actuary Society, provided that they have specialized study in Canadian actuarial practice. For fellows of the SOA, this is fulfilled by taking the CIA's Practice Education Course (PEC). For fellows of the Casualty Actuarial Society, this is fulfilled by taking the nation-specific Exam 6-Canada, instead of Exam 6-United States. Further, the CIA requires three years of actuarial practice within the previous decade, and 18 months of Canadian actuarial practice within the last three years, to become a fellow.

Denmark
In Denmark it normally takes five years of study at the University of Copenhagen to become an actuary with no professional experience requirement. There is a focus on statistics and probability theory, and a requirement for a master's thesis. By Danish law, responsibility for the practice of any life insurance business must be taken by a formally acknowledged and approved actuary. Approval as a formally responsible actuary requires three to five years of professional experience.

Germany
Current rules for the German Actuarial Society require an actuary to pass more than 13 exams.

India
The Actuarial Society of India (now converted into Institute of Actuaries of India) offers both associate-ship and fellowship classes of membership. However, prospective candidates must be admitted to the society as students before they achieve associate-ship or fellowship. The exam sequence is similar to the British model, with Core and Specialty technical and application exams. The exams are conducted twice a year during the months of May–June and October–November. Starting from January 2012, the institute has started conducting entrance exam. Only those applicants who clear the entrance test can appear for the Core Technical papers.

Norway
In Norway the education to become an actuary takes five years. The education usually consists of a bachelor's degree (three years) and a master's degree (two years). The bachelor's degree needs to contain a specific number of courses in mathematics and statistics. The master's degree usually consists of one year of courses and one year writing a master's degree about a topic related to the actuarial profession. The University of Bergen and The University of Oslo offer the education to become an actuary in Norway.
To become an international qualified actuary, a person with a Norwegian actuarial education must also take two courses in economics (macroeconomics and accounting) and a course in ethics. The ethics course, which lasts a day, is offered by the Norwegian Society of Actuaries.

South Africa
Actuaries in South Africa are served by the Actuarial Society of South Africa (ASSA). Until recently  the requirement to qualify as an actuary in South Africa was to pass the exams hosted by the UK bodies. Starting in 2010, a South African actuarial qualification hosted by ASSA has replaced this arrangement. Key changes include exam syllabuses based on South African-specific content. The UK actuarial professional bodies, however, still support qualification through the UK. Students may receive exemption from part of the examinations for qualification from approved universities. The South African qualification does have mutual recognition with many of the international actuarial bodies as well as approval of the syllabus from the International Actuarial Association.

One may obtain the Chartered Enterprise Risk Actuary (CERA) designation through the ASSA.

Sweden
Actuarial training in Sweden takes place at Stockholm University. The five-year master's program (for those with no previous university-level knowledge in mathematics, or without a bachelor's degree in mathematics) covers the subjects mathematics, mathematical statistics, insurance mathematics, financial mathematics, insurance law and insurance economics. The program operates under the Division of Mathematical Statistics.

UK and Ireland
Qualification in the United Kingdom and Ireland consists of a combination of exams and courses provided by the Institute and Faculty of Actuaries. The exams may only be taken upon having officially joined the body, unlike many other countries where exams may be taken earlier. Most trainee actuaries study while working for an actuarial employer using resources provided by ActEd (The Actuarial Education Company, a subsidiary of BPP Actuarial Education Ltd.), which is contracted to provide actuarial tuition for students on behalf of Institute and Faculty Education Ltd (IFE), a subsidiary of the Institute and Faculty of Actuaries.

However, a candidate may offer proof of having previously covered topics (at a high enough standard, usually while at university) to be exempt from taking certain subjects.

The exams themselves are split into four sections: Core Principles (CP), Core Practices (CP), Specialists Principles (SP), and Specialist Advance (SA). For students who joined the Profession after June 2004, a further requirement that the student carry out a "Work-based skills" exercise has been brought into effect. This involves the student submitting a series of essays to the Profession detailing the work that he or she has performed. In addition to exams, essays and courses, it is required that the candidate have at least three years' experience of actuarial work under supervision of a recognized actuary to qualify as a Fellow of the Institute of Actuaries (FIA) or of the Faculty of Actuaries (FFA).

Note that the UK Profession is currently introducing the Certified Actuarial Analyst (CAA) qualification to "provide those working in financial and actuarial roles at a technical level around the world with valuable skills and a well respected qualification".

United States
In the U.S., for life, health, and pension actuaries, exams are given by the Society of Actuaries, while for property-casualty actuaries the exams are administered by the Casualty Actuarial Society. The Society of Actuaries’ requirements for Associateship include passing five preliminary examinations, demonstrating educational experience in economics, corporate finance, and applied statistics—called validation by educational experience (VEE), completing an eight-module self-learning series, and taking a course on professionalism. For Fellowship, three other modules, three or four exams depending on specialty track, and a special fellowship admission course is added. The Casualty Actuarial Society requires the successful completion of seven examinations, two modules, and economics and corporate finance VEEs for Associateship and three additional exams for Fellowship. In addition to these requirements, casualty actuarial candidates must also complete professionalism education and be recommended for membership by existing members.

To sign certain statements of actuarial opinion, however, American actuaries must be members of the American Academy of Actuaries. Academy membership requirements include membership in one of the recognized actuarial societies, at least three years of full-time equivalent experience in responsible actuarial work, and either residency in the United States for at least three years or a non-resident or new resident who meets certain requirements. Continuing education is required after certification for all actuaries who sign statements of actuarial opinion.

Preliminary exams
Dependent on which society a student chooses to pursue, there are anywhere from six to seven preliminary exams. Most of the exams are multiple choice and administered on computers at Prometric testing centers. Candidates are allowed to use a calculator from an approved list. The exams are timed and last between three and four hours. Some tests provide instant feedback as to whether or not a candidate has passed that particular exam (see table below). All test scores (on a 0-10 scale with 6 or higher passing) are posted six to eight weeks after the test. However, due to the way the test is scaled,  the scores can range from 0–10, but there are also situations where the highest grade for a test is a 9 even if every single question was answered correctly. This is because the interval is 10 percent of the score required to pass, which means the following:

Let P be the passing percentage.

Passing Scores:
 If you score between P and 1.1P, you get a 6;
 If you score between 1.1P and 1.2P, you get a 7;
 If you score between 1.2P and 1.3P, you get an 8;
 Between 1.3P and 1.4P, 9;
 Greater than 1.4P, 10;

Failing Scores:
 If you score between 0.9P and P, you get a 5;
 Between 0.8P and 0.9P, 4;
 Between 0.7P and 0.8P, 3;
 Between 0.6P and 0.7P, 2;
 Between 0.5P and 0.6P, 1;
 Less than 0.5P, 0.

That is, grade 10 is unachievable. Hence, the highest grade achievable can be 9 for a test.

SOA administers exam LTAM (previously MLC), which covers life contingencies topics. Starting in May 2014, MLC includes both multiple choice and open-response questions. SOA made this change because, in their view, strict multiple-choice questions are not sufficient or adequate to test whether candidates are familiar with and fluent in the material. The test is four hours long, allows calculators, and is administered via a paper-and-pencil format. Multiple-choice questions account for 40% of the exam, and open-response questions account for 60% of the exam. Candidates may freely move between the two sections. The two sections are graded separately. However, since the multiple-choice questions are easier, only candidates who have answered a certain percentage of the multiple-choice questions correctly have their written answers graded. For instance, a multiple-choice score of 24 points was needed to have written-answer questions graded for the April 2021 LTAM exam.

Notes

References

External links 
 Society of Actuaries website
 Casualty Actuarial Society website
 Faculty and Institute of Actuaries
 Actuarial Exam information for students
 International Actuarial Association
 ActEd website
 Actuarial Society of South Africa

Actuarial science
Mathematical science occupations
Professional titles and certifications